Miar Glacier is a glacier that forms in the north of Miar Peak in Hoper Valley in Nagar, Gilgit-Baltistan, Pakistan. It is a major component of the Barpu Glacier.

See also
Miar Peak
Northern Areas
List of glaciers

External links
 Northern Pakistan detailed placemarks in Google Earth

References 

Glaciers of Gilgit-Baltistan